Jim Pollock (born 16 November 1958) in Newcastle is a Scottish former international rugby union player. His nickname was "Lucky Jim". Jim played eight games for Scotland between 1982 and 1985. Famously scoring on his debut against Wales, at Cardiff Arms Park where Scotland hadn't won in 20 years. Jim scored his second try against New Zealand in a 25-25 draw - to date Scotland's best ever result against the All blacks. Pollock worked as a Police Officer for Northumbria Police and later Isle of Man and previously worked as a P.E. teacher kenton comprehensive schoo & Royal Grammar School, Newcastle upon Tyne.

References

1958 births
Living people
Rugby union players from Newcastle upon Tyne
Scottish rugby union players
Scotland international rugby union players
Rugby union wings
Newcastle Falcons players